Bojan Razpet (born January 22, 1960) is a former Yugoslav ice hockey player. He played for the Yugoslavia men's national ice hockey team at the 1984 Winter Olympics in Sarajevo.

References

1960 births
Living people
HK Acroni Jesenice players
Ice hockey players at the 1984 Winter Olympics
Olympic ice hockey players of Yugoslavia
Sportspeople from Jesenice, Jesenice
Slovenian ice hockey forwards
Yugoslav ice hockey forwards